The Division of O'Connor is an Australian electoral division in the state of Western Australia. It is one of Western Australia's three rural seats, and one of the largest electoral constituencies in the world.

Geography
Since 1984, federal electoral division boundaries in Australia have been determined at redistributions by a redistribution committee appointed by the Australian Electoral Commission. Redistributions occur for the boundaries of divisions in a particular state, and they occur every seven years, or sooner if a state's representation entitlement changes or when divisions of a state are malapportioned.

History

The division was named after Charles Yelverton O'Connor, the Engineer-in-Chief of Western Australia most famously known for designing the Fremantle Harbour and the Goldfields Pipeline. The division was proclaimed at the redistribution of 28 February 1980, and was first contested at the 1980 federal election. It has always been a rural seat.

For its first three decades, it took in large portions of the Mid West, Wheatbelt and Great Southern regions of Western Australia with major population centres in Geraldton and Albany.  The division was significantly altered by a redistribution in 2008, taking effect at the 2010 election.  The other large country seat in Western Australia, Kalgoorlie, already the largest single-member electorate in the world, needed to expand in size. However, it soon became apparent that redistributing Kalgoorlie would have made it all but impossible to reconfigure O'Connor in a way that would have had any rational basis. Ultimately, it was decided to abolish Kalgoorlie and push O'Connor well to the east to take in most of Kalgoorlie's former southern portion, including the city of Kalgoorlie itself. The northern portion of the old O'Connor was transferred to the new seat of Durack.

In August 2021, the Australian Electoral Commission (AEC) announced that O'Connor would receive the Wheatbelt Shires of Bruce Rock, Cunderdin, Kellerberrin, Koorda, Kulin, Merredin, Mount Marshall, Mukinbudin, Narembeen, Nungarin, Quairading, Tammin, Trayning, Westonia, Wyalkatchem and Yilgarn and the Mid West Shire of Wiluna from the seat of Durack, while it would also receive the Wheatbelt Shire of Beverley from the seat of Pearce and the South West Shires of Boddington and Nannup from the seats of Canning and Forrest, respectively. These boundary changes took place at the 2022 election.

It now includes the Great Southern region (Albany, Broomehill-Tambellup, Cranbrook, Denmark, Gnowangerup, Jerramungup, Katanning, Kent, Kojonup, Plantagenet, and Woodanilling), the Goldfields-Esperance region (Coolgardie, Dundas, Esperance, Kalgoorlie-Boulder, Laverton, Leonora, Menzies, Ngaanyatjarraku, and Ravensthorpe), the Mid West Shire of Wiluna, parts of the South-West region (Boyup Brook, Bridgetown-Greenbushes, Collie, Manjimup and Nannup), and the southern portion of the Wheatbelt (Beverley, Boddington, Brookton, Bruce Rock, Corrigin, Cuballing, Cunderdin, Dumbleyung, Kellerberrin, Kondinin, Koorda, Kulin, Lake Grace, Merredin, Mount Marshall, Mukinbudin, Narembeen, Narrogin, Nungarin, Pingelly, Quairading, Tammin, Trayning, Wagin, Wandering, West Arthur, Westonia, Wickepin, Williams, Wiluna, Wyalkatchem and Yilgarn).

The seat has always been held by a conservative party. When it was created, its demographics suggested that it should have been held by the National Country Party, despite its large notional Liberal majority. However, severe conflict between rival branches of the state National Party allowed Liberal Wilson Tuckey to take the seat on Labor preferences. Tuckey held it without serious difficulty until his defeat at the 2010 election by Nationals WA candidate Tony Crook with a large swing.  However, the Liberals regained the seat at the 2013 election.

Members

Election results

References

External links
 Division of O'Connor - Australian Electoral Commission

Electoral divisions of Australia
Constituencies established in 1980
1980 establishments in Australia
Federal politics in Western Australia